The Brunegghorn is a mountain of the Pennine Alps, overlooking the Mattertal in the canton of Valais. It is part of the Weisshorn group. On the west side of the mountain flows the Brunegg Glacier.

References

External links
 Brunegghorn on Summitpost

Mountains of the Alps
Alpine three-thousanders
Mountains of Switzerland
Mountains of Valais
Three-thousanders of Switzerland